Julien Kialunda (24 April 1940 – 14 September 1987) was a Congolese international footballer. He was one of the first Congolese footballers to play professionally in Europe. He represented Zaire at the 1972 African Cup of Nations.

Career 
Kialunda played for Union Saint-Gilloise, RSC Anderlecht and Léopold FC in Belgium. He was a four time Belgian league champion with Anderlecht.

International career 
Kialunda represented Zaire at the 1972 African Cup of Nations in Cameroon, where he started in all of his team's five matches as Zaire finished fourth.

Post-career 
After his retirement, Kialunda was national coach of the Zaire national team, without much success. He also owned a cafe for a while in the Brussels neighborhood of Matonge, known for its predominantly African population. In 1987, sick with AIDS, he decided to return to Belgium to be treated and die there. He died on 14 September the same year.

A charity is founded in his memory, the "Julien Kialunda Foundation", that is engaged in worthy causes in the Democratic Republic of the Congo. It is sponsored by professional players of African origin playing or having grew up in Belgium, like the brothers Mbo and Émile Mpenza, Mohammed Tchité and Anthony Vanden Borre.

Honours

Player

Union Saint-Gilloise 

 Belgian Second Division: 1963-64

RSC Anderlecht

 Belgian First Division: 1965–66, 1966–67, 1967–68, 1971–72
 Belgian Cup: 1971–72, 1972–73
 Belgian League Cup: 1973
 Inter-Cities Fairs Cup runners-up: 1969–70

References

1940 births
1987 deaths
People from Matadi
Association football defenders
Democratic Republic of the Congo footballers
Democratic Republic of the Congo expatriate footballers
Democratic Republic of the Congo international footballers
1972 African Cup of Nations players
Expatriate footballers in Belgium
Royale Union Saint-Gilloise players
R.S.C. Anderlecht players
Léopold FC players
Belgian Pro League players
Democratic Republic of the Congo expatriate sportspeople in Belgium
Democratic Republic of the Congo football managers
Democratic Republic of the Congo national football team managers
AIDS-related deaths in Belgium